Marina Klimenchenko (born January 24, 1966) is a Russian Paralympic shooter from Khabarovsk who won a silver medal at the 2012 Summer Paralympics. She has Cerebral palsy and is studying medicine at Khabarovsk State Medical Institute.

References

1966 births
Living people
Russian female sport shooters
Paralympic shooters of Russia
Paralympic silver medalists for Russia
Paralympic bronze medalists for Russia
Paralympic medalists in shooting
Shooters at the 2012 Summer Paralympics
Medalists at the 2012 Summer Paralympics
Sportspeople from Khabarovsk
20th-century Russian women
21st-century Russian women